Noppawan "Nok" Lertcheewakarn (born 18 November 1991) is a former professional Thai tennis player. At 2009 Wimbledon Championships, she won the junior singles title. She reached career-high WTA rankings of 149 in singles and 97 in doubles.

As of July 2018, Lertcheewakarn having played her last match in August 2017, is in training to be a police officer. She has yet to officially retire.

Playing style
Lertcheewakarn is a counterpuncher with her two-handed backhand and forehand. Her game is lacking powerful strokes, but based on precise groundstrokes and good strategy. Her main weakness is considered to be her serve, lacking of power, consistency and stability.

She has had inspiration by Tamarine Tanasugarn, Monica Seles, Marion Bartoli, and Williams sisters.
Lertcheewakarn has been coached by Chuck Kriese.

Junior career
In 2008, Lertcheewakarn was world No. 1 in ITF Junior Circuit, became the first Thai player to ever hold that position. In the same year, Lertcheewakarn won the girls' ITF World Champions.

She has reached two Grand Slam girls' singles finals: 2008 Wimbledon losing to Laura Robson, and 2009 Wimbledon beating Kristina Mladenovic. She also reached four Grand Slam girls' doubles finals, won 2008 US Open with Sandra Roma, 2009 French Open with Elena Bogdan, 2009 Wimbledon with Sally Peers, but lost the 2009 US Open, partnering Elena Bogdan.

Professional career

2006–2009
Lertcheewakarn started playing her first ITF Circuit events in August 2006. She made her WTA Tour main-draw debut in 2007 as a qualifier, defeating world No. 97, Melinda Czink of Hungary, in straight sets in the final qualifying round, before losing to Aiko Nakamura in three sets in the first round.

In May 2008, Lertcheewakarn won her first pro title in singles at $25k Balikpapan, defeating the top seed Isha Lakhani of India, in straight sets. In 2009, Lertcheewakarn received a main-draw wildcard into the Pattaya Open; she lost her first-round match against Shahar Pe'er, which lasted 52 minutes, 1–6, 0–6.

2010
She received a wildcard to Pattaya Open, but lost in the first round to Chanelle Scheepers, in a two-hour-and-forty-minute three-set match in which Lertcheewakarn had a 4–1 lead in the second set. She then received a wildcard to the Malaysian Open where she beat Ksenia Pervak in the first round in straight sets, making this her first WTA main-draw win ever. At the $50k Nottingham Trophy, she advanced into the quarterfinals, before losing to Elena Baltacha in two straight sets. Lertcheewakarn received a wildcard entry to the Wimbledon Championships where she was defeated by Andrea Hlaváčková in the first round. She ended the year inside top 200 in singles and doubles.

2011
Lertcheewakarn qualified for the Auckland Open but lost to Heather Watson in the first round, 1–6, 1–6. At the Malaysian Open, she defeated Alberta Brianti, 6–4, 2–6, 6–2, and lost to a qualifier Anne Kremer in the second round. In doubles, Lertcheewakarn reached a WTA tournament final, partnering Jessica Moore, they lost to Dinara Safina and Galina Voskoboeva in a close match. She lost in the first round of the Baku Cup to Ksenia Pervak, having led 5–3 in the third set. 

At the US Open, Lertcheewakarn qualified for her second Grand Slam main draw, defeating Zuzana Kučová, Ashley Weinhold and Kristýna Plíšková in three tough matches. In the first round, in just her second Grand Slam tournament, she lost to Anastasiya Yakimova 0–6, 6–4, 3–6. Lertcheewakarn won the Al Habtoor Challenge, beat Bojana Jovanovski, Regina Kulikova, Simona Halep and Kristina Mladenovic en route. She also qualified for HP Open but lost to Samantha Stosur in three sets, she was two points away to score the victory. In 2011, Lertcheewakarn broke into top 100 in doubles and top 150 in singles.

2012
She reached the final of the $50k event in Gifu but lost to Kimiko Date-Krumm, in three sets. She qualified for the Birmingham Classic main draw, defeating Sesil Karatantcheva en route. In the first round, she lost to Misaki Doi in three sets.
At the Stanford Classic, Lertcheewakarn lost to Nicole Gibbs, 4–6, 4–6.

WTA career finals

Doubles: 1 (runner-up)

WTA Challenger finals

Doubles: 1 (runner–up)

ITF Circuit finals

Singles: 14 (5 titles, 9 runner–ups)

Doubles: 18 (8 titles, 10 runner–ups)

Grand Slam tournament performance timelines

Singles

Doubles

References

External links

 
 
 Lertcheewakarn Noppawan CoreTennis Profile

Noppawan Lertcheewakarn
Noppawan Lertcheewakarn
1991 births
Living people
Tennis players at the 2010 Asian Games
Asian Games medalists in tennis
Wimbledon junior champions
US Open (tennis) junior champions
Grand Slam (tennis) champions in girls' singles
Grand Slam (tennis) champions in girls' doubles
Tennis players at the 2014 Asian Games
Noppawan Lertcheewakarn
Medalists at the 2010 Asian Games
Universiade medalists in tennis
Noppawan Lertcheewakarn
Noppawan Lertcheewakarn
Noppawan Lertcheewakarn
Southeast Asian Games medalists in tennis
Competitors at the 2007 Southeast Asian Games
Competitors at the 2011 Southeast Asian Games
Competitors at the 2015 Southeast Asian Games
Universiade silver medalists for Thailand
Medalists at the 2013 Summer Universiade
Medalists at the 2015 Summer Universiade
Noppawan Lertcheewakarn